Edward Charles "Jumbo" Cartwright (October 6, 1859 – September 3, 1933) was a professional first baseman in Major League Baseball in 1890 and from 1894 to 1897.  He played for the St. Louis Browns of the American Association (predecessor of the current St. Louis Cardinals) and the Washington Senators of the National League.

Cartwright is most famous for having seven RBI in one inning, accomplished with the Browns on September 23, 1890; his record would stand for 109 years until it was broken by Fernando Tatís of the Cardinals on April 23, 1999. Cartwright also hit for the cycle on September 30, 1895, while playing for the Senators against the Boston Beaneaters.



See also
 List of Major League Baseball players to hit for the cycle

References

Further reading

External links
, or Retrosheet

1859 births
1933 deaths
Baseball players from Pennsylvania
St. Louis Browns (AA) players
Washington Senators (1891–1899) players
Major League Baseball first basemen
19th-century baseball players
Youngstown (minor league baseball) players
Acid Iron Earths players
New Orleans Pelicans (baseball) players
Kansas City Blues (baseball) players
St. Joseph Clay Eaters players
Hamilton Hams players
Montreal (minor league baseball) players
San Francisco Friscos players
San Francisco Metropolitans players
Missoula (minor league baseball) players
Tacoma Daisies players
Memphis Fever Germs players
Minneapolis Millers (baseball) players